Lamine Ba (born 24 August 1997) is a professional footballer who plays as a defender for HNL club Varaždin. Born in France, he plays for the Mauritania national team.

Club career 
Ba is a graduate of the youth academy of Guingamp, he joined Paris Saint-Germain in the summer of 2015. He made his debut in an UEFA Youth League match against Real Madrid. During the same match, he was scouted by scouts of English club Liverpool. On 15 February 2017, he joined Italian club Virtus Entella on a free transfer.

On 24 July 2017, Ba signed for Cypriot club Doxa. He was assigned the number 4 jersey.

International career 
On 26 March 2022, Ba made his first appearance for the Mauritania national team in a 2–1 friendly win over Mozambique. He scored the winning goal in stoppage time.

References

External links

1997 births
Living people
Association football defenders
French footballers
Mauritanian footballers
French sportspeople of Mauritanian descent
Citizens of Mauritania through descent
En Avant Guingamp players
Paris Saint-Germain F.C. players
Virtus Entella players
Doxa Katokopias FC players
FC Progrès Niederkorn players
Championnat National 3 players
Championnat National 2 players
Cypriot First Division players
French expatriate footballers
Mauritanian expatriate footballers
Expatriate footballers in Italy
Expatriate footballers in Cyprus
Expatriate footballers in Luxembourg
French expatriate sportspeople in Italy
French expatriate sportspeople in Cyprus
French expatriate sportspeople in Luxembourg
Mauritanian expatriate sportspeople in Luxembourg